Azorella fuegiana is a species of flowering plant in the genus Azorella found in Chile.

External links
 Azorella fuegiana at Plants for Life.org.

fuegiana
Flora of Chile
Taxa named by Carlo Luigi Spegazzini